In automobile engineering, electric vehicle conversion is the replacement of a car's combustion engine and connected components with an electric motor and batteries, to create an all-electric vehicle (AEV).

There are two main aims for converting an internal combustion engine vehicle (aka combustion vehicle) to run as a battery-electric vehicle. The first is to reduce the emissions of vehicles that are already on the road, as electric vehicles do not produce any emissions themselves.

The second is to reduce the vast amount of waste created when cars reach the end of their lifecycle – as older cars or those written off after a road traffic accident are typically scrapped. This creates a considerable amount of metal, plastic and fabric waste, and uses a large amount of energy to recycle discarded parts into useful materials.

Price is another key catalyst for the growing electric car conversion market. The cost of electric car batteries and motors has fallen in recent years, and the cost of conversion is dependent in many factors, including range and batteries used for conversion. Not all conversion companies are equal.

Elements of a conversion

Almost any vehicle can be converted to electric. Many people prefer to pick a vehicle that is light and aerodynamic in order to maximize distance traveled per battery charge. There must also be adequate room and load capacity for batteries.
If obtaining a vehicle for conversion, choose a car which has an undamaged body (unless also doing the body work).
The battery pack, which provides a source of electrical power. The most commonly available and affordable batteries are lead-acid flooded type. Next are the AGM (absorption glass mat) sealed maintenance-free batteries, a little more powerful and expensive. Then there are the more exotic batteries like Ni-MH and Li-ion; more difficult to find but light and longer-lasting, maintenance-free, and much more expensive. The new lithium batteries are showing some promise for EVs in the near future.
The charger which restores energy to the batteries (which may be mounted within the vehicle or at a special charging station at some fixed location)
The power controller, which regulates the flow of energy between the battery and the electric motor(s), controlled by an electronic throttle.
One or more electric motors and their mechanical attachment to the driveline
Power conductors connecting the battery, controller, and motor(s)
Accessory equipment to power auxiliary equipment such as power brakes and heating system
Control circuitry and equipment to allow control and interlocking of the various components
Instrumentation specific to the operation and maintenance of the conversion

Electric car conversion industry

Electric car conversion has gone from being exclusively conducted by hobbyists and enthusiasts, to a rapidly growing industry.

Spurred on by the climate crisis, electric vehicle conversions address the shortfall in new EV availability and also offer a more affordable route for many, as new electric vehicles remain more expensive than their internal combustion engine counterparts. This has also seen the EV conversion industry diverge away from only converting classic and high-end cars.

As of early 2021, it is now possible to convert a petrol, diesel or hybrid vehicle to run as a battery electric car for around £6,000 ($8,300).

The industry has worked closely with regulators across a number of countries to establish safety protocols and to ensure that annual vehicle inspection tests on electric conversions are conducted in the same way that any other electric vehicle would be.

The biggest barrier to the widespread success of the EV conversion industry is the availability of batteries and motors, as vehicle manufacturers are not eager to sell their technology for this purpose. However, an open source community has grown alongside the electric vehicle conversion industry to enable batteries and motors from different manufacturers to work in unison in order to lower costs and overcome availability issues.

To meet the growing demand for trained mechanics who can carry out electric vehicle conversion, organizations such as New Electric Ireland have developed training programmes to educate mechanics and hobbyists in how to carry out conversions.

Since 2020, French regulations have authorized the electric conversion (retrofit) of a vehicle. To be converted to electric, the combustion vehicle must be roadworthy, registered in France and more than 5 years old.

Hobbyist conversions

Hobbyists often build their own EVs by converting existing production cars to run solely on electricity. There is a cottage industry supporting the conversion and construction of BEVs by hobbyists. Universities such as the University of California, Irvine even build their own custom electric or hybrid-electric cars from scratch.

Short-range battery electric vehicles can offer the hobbyist comfort, utility, and quickness, sacrificing only range. Short-range EVs may be built using high-performance lead–acid batteries, using about half the mass needed for a  range. The result is a vehicle with about a  range, which, when designed with appropriate weight distribution (40/60 front to rear), does not require power steering, offers exceptional acceleration in the lower end of its operating range, and is freeway capable and legal. But their EVs are expensive due to the higher cost for these higher-performance batteries. By including a manual transmission, short-range EVs can obtain both better performance and greater efficiency than the single-speed EVs developed by major manufacturers. Unlike the converted golf carts used for neighborhood electric vehicles, short-range EVs may be operated on typical suburban throughways (where  speed limits are typical) and can keep up with traffic typical on such roads and the short "slow-lane" on-and-off segments of freeways common in suburban areas.

Faced with chronic fuel shortage on the Gaza Strip, Palestinian electrical engineer Waseem Othman al-Khozendar invented in 2008 a way to convert his car to run on 32 electric batteries.

In 2008, several Chinese manufacturers began marketing lithium iron phosphate batteries directly to hobbyists and vehicle conversion shops. As the  cells feature life ratings of 3,000 cycles, compared to typical lead acid battery ratings of 300 cycles, the life expectancy of  cells is around 10 years.  cells require more expensive battery management and charging systems than lead acid batteries.

Solar power

On-board solar cells can be used to power an electric vehicle. The small power generated by solar cells mounted on a vehicle means that the other components in the system must be special to compensate for this.

Conversion process
The conversion process starts with the selection of a donor car, which can be powered by petrol, diesel or hybrid. The engine, fuel tank and gearbox are then removed and replaced with an electric motor, batteries and an inverter.

If the donor vehicle is a hybrid, the driveshaft can be retained also, as it has already been designed to work with electric car batteries and power delivery systems. It is common for the batteries used in electric car conversions to be recycled from new electric vehicles which have been involved in a traffic accident. In Europe, the curb weight of the donor car will need to be retained once it is converted.

Once the car has been converted, it will need to be assessed by a vehicle safety engineer before it can be used on the road.

In some countries, the user can choose to buy a converted vehicle of any model in the automaker dealerships only paying the cost of the batteries and motor, with no installation costs (it is called pre-conversion or previous conversion).

Industry

The electric vehicle conversion industry has grown to include conversion car garages, aftermarket kits and vehicle components. Some companies focus specifically on certain classic cars (i.e. VW Beetle, Rolls-Royce, Jaguar, Citroën H Van, etc.)

The work of these companies has been highlighted by publications including Autocar, Fully Charged, IrishEVs and Auto Express as prices have fallen and demand has increased for affordable conversions alongside high-end options.

Vehicle types

Electric bicycle

An electric bicycle is a conventional bicycle that has been fitted with an electric motor. Most often electric bicycles or e-bikes are powered by rechargeable batteries however some experimental electric bicycles run directly on or recharge their batteries via solar panels, fuel cells, gas generators or other alternative energy sources. Using an on-board generator may impact the legal jurisdictional definition of an electric bicycle. A few types of electric bicycles are able to re-capture a small amount of energy from braking and can re-charge the batteries while braking or traveling down hills (regenerative braking).

Some electric bikes have features where the motor can move the bicycle by itself (immediate start) if the rider chooses not to pedal with a button or throttle controller, while others require the rider to pedal at all times (pedal assist). This latter type may in some jurisdictions allow the vehicle to be used on bicycle trails that otherwise prohibit motorized vehicles of any kind (see motorized bicycle).

Many battery technologies are available for powering electric bikes. The most common and least expensive battery technology is sealed lead acid but LiFePO4 is fast becoming the battery of choice for the e-bike.

Converting one's bike to electric with a conversion kit is an easy and affordable solution for most people interested in learning more about electric vehicle conversion.

Registration of converted and newly constructed vehicles

United States
The ease of registration will vary by state. Some states require safety inspections, usually to ensure body integrity in areas subject to severe corrosion from winter road de-icing materials. In any case, for general registration all functional safety equipment should be operating – turn signals, brake lights, headlights, horn, etc. The windshield should have no running cracks (small stone chips and "stars" may be acceptable if not in the driver's principal line of vision). If the vehicle has been reconstructed from a salvage vehicle (a vehicle whose registration has been forfeited) inspection may be more severe to ensure compliance and the legitimacy of sources of salvage components by presentation of proper purchase receipts.

Registration procedures will vary by state and will usually be more difficult in states with strict emissions requirements.

On the other hand, changing the registration allows a conversion to qualify for tax incentives available in some states, such as Oregon, for either the vehicle, the charging system, or both.

California (US) conversion registration and taxation

The State of California makes provisions to inspect electric vehicle conversions.  Electric vehicles are exempted from emissions control inspections. A vehicle may either a substantially new build, or a conversion of an existing vehicle.

Spain
In Spain, the conversion (called transformation) is regulated by Real Decreto 866/2010, de 2 de julio, por el que se regula la tramitación de las reformas de vehículos.

See also
 Aftermarket (automotive)
 CalCars
 Conversion to sleeper car
 Electric car
 Engine swap
 Green tuning
 Kit car
 Maker culture
 Plug-in hybrid (PHEV)
 Vehicle glider

References

 
Electric vehicles
Green vehicles
Plug-in hybrid vehicle industry